Uhligia schilskyi is a species of beetles in the family Mordellidae, the only species in the genus Uhligia.

References

Mordellinae
Beetles described in 1915